Big Moses is an unincorporated community in Tyler County, West Virginia, United States, along Indian Creek, The town name was named after the Big Moses oil well.

References 

Unincorporated communities in West Virginia
Unincorporated communities in Tyler County, West Virginia